Middleburgh may refer to:

 Middleburgh, New York, a town in Schoharie County, New York, United States
 Middleburgh (village), New York, within the town of Middleburgh

See also
Middleburg (disambiguation)